Globovisión is a 24-hour television news network.  It broadcasts over-the-air in Caracas, Aragua, Carabobo and Zulia on UHF channel 33.  Globovisión is seen in the rest of Venezuela on cable or satellite (Globovisión has an alliance with DirecTV, where it can be seen on channel 110) and worldwide from their website.  Some of Globovisión's programs can be seen in the United States on cable network Canal Sur and TV Venezuela, a channel offered in DirecTV's Para Todos package. In Latin America, Globovision can be seen in Argentina, Colombia, Chile, Ecuador, Peru, Uruguay and other territories as Aruba, Trinidad and Tobago, Barbados and Curaçao in DirecTV's package (channel 724).

History
On December 1, 1994, Luis Teófilo Núñez Arismendi, Guillermo Zuloaga Núñez, Nelson Mezerhane Gosen, and Alberto Federico Ravell Arreaza, inaugurated Globovisión, channel 33, the first 24-hour news network in Venezuela to broadcast over-the-air.  Currently,  Globovisión is broadcast over the air in Caracas, Aragua, Carabobo and Zulia.  Globovisión's programming is also carried by 95 percent of the nation's cable systems.
On February 17, 2010, Ravell, general director of the channel, was dismissed from his post by board of directors of Globovision due to "differences with its partners". Ravell said he had to " sacrifice himself leaving office for the channel wasn't sold and falls into the hands of Government of Hugo Chavez".

In 2009, pro-government leader Lina Ron led an armed attack on Globovisión, where she and attackers threw tear gas into the headquarters of the news organization that left injured multiple individuals inside and threatened its security with firearms.

In 2013, Globovisión was sold to an economist and businessman with connections to the Venezuelan government, Juan Domingo Cordero, who also runs the insurance company La Vitalicia.
“Our mission, criticized by many, but applauded by our great audience, has helped us to prove that, in spite of adversities, sanctions and threats, we are still standing, with a professional and technical team of invaluable working mystic, that knows how to fulfill their duty, that looks for the news without caring about conditions and some times even putting their lives at risk.”

International
Overseas, Globovisión has affiliations with CNN en Español, RCN, Canal N, Panamericana Televisión, Canal Sur, Canal 13, Todo Noticias, Monte Carlo Televisión, Canal 4, Canal 8, and Ecuavisa.

Shows
Most of the shows seen on Globovisión are national productions. They include:
Aló Ciudadano – A call-in show hosted by Leopoldo Castillo. This program was simulcasted on the Radio Caracas Radio after Hugo Chavez government expropriated the radio network Circuito Nacional Belfort. In the network until 2013 was co-hosted by Sheina Chang, Maria Alejandra Trujillo, Pedro Pablo Peñaloza, Carlos Acosta and Andreina Fuenmayor. The interim host were Nitu Pérez Osuna and María Elena Lavaud.
Aló Venezuela – A  Sunday talk show hosted by Del Valle Canelon and Ismael Garcia.
Tocando Fondo – A talk show, hosted by Ana Karina Villalba seen on Sundays at 11am.
Vladimir a la Una – A daily talk show, hosted by Vladimir Villegas Polhiak at 1pm.
Entre Noticias – A weekend news show hosted by Marianna Gomez
Plomovisión – A documentary series hosted by Johnny Ficarella. This program's name originated from an epithet given to the channel by President Hugo Chávez.
 Shirley – A talk show hosted by Jewish journalist Shirley Varnagy
Primera Página – A morning news show hosted by Aymara Lorenzo, José Vicente Antonetti, Carolina Alcalde, Jessica Morales, and Andreína Gandica. It comes on at 6am on weekdays. José Domingo Blanco and Nathaly Salas Guaithero once hosted this show. It was originally hosted by Julio César Camacho.
Brujula Internacional – An evening international news show hosted by ambassador Julio César Pineda.
En la Mañana – Another morning news show hosted by Williams Echeverría.
Biografías – A documentary series on famous Venezuelan personalities hosted by Maky Arenas.
Hablan las Paredes – A night talk show, hosted by Guillermo Tell Troconis.
Mujeres en Todo (program) – A live variety show with Alba Cecilia Mujica, Maria Isabel Parraga and Veronica Rasquin.
Titulares de Mañana – A show which reveals the front pages of tomorrow's newspapers in Venezuela. This show was originally hosted by Orlando Urdaneta.  Orlando Urdaneta then changed the program's name to La Hora de Orlando in 2003. After he left Globovisión in 2004, the name was reverted to "Titulares de Mañana" with Pedro Luis Flores and  Jesus "Chuo" Torrealba as its host.
Noticias Globovisión – The network's main newscast, anchored by Gladys Rodríguez, Roman Lozinski, Juan Eleazar Figallo and Diana Carolina Ruiz. It has several daily broadcasts anchored by Carlos Alberto Figueroa and Jorge Luis Perez Valery.
Grado 33 – A news documentary series hosted by Norberto Mazza, María Elena Lavaud and Roberto Giusti. This program was very critical of the Chávez government.
Soluciones – morning talk show hosted by Shirley Varnagy, Nathalie Viteznik.
CNN World Report – Saturday morning ecological program hosted by Fernando Jauregui
El Radar de los Barrios – morning talk show hosted by Chuo Torrealba.
La cocinita de Sindy – Saturday cooking talk show hosted by Sindy Lazo.
35MM – One of the few non-political shows on Globovisión, it contains the latest news on upcoming Hollywood movies and is hosted by Víctor X.
 Faranduleando, which contains celebrity news.
 Paparazzi del Deporte, which contains sport celebrity news.
Usted lo vio – Week news Summary show host by Juan Eleazar Figallo.
Ecopracticas – Saturday morning ecological program hosted by Fernando Jauregui
Alta Densidad – A technology news show hosted by Carlos José Monzón.
Sin Flash TV – A show, hosted by beauty queen Cynthia Lander, about the currently most popular society parties and events in Venezuela and world.
 Saber Vivir- A health micro by Martha Palma Troconis.
 Alta Postura- A fashion program  hosted by Giancarlo Berardinelli
Con todo y Penzini – A variety news show hosted by Pedro Penzini.
Se Habla Verde – An ecological micro conducted by Karen Bitton.
Deportes Globovisión – Globovisión's sports show hosted by Aloys Marín and
Así Cocina Soucy – A cooking and gourmet show hosted by Héctor Soucy.
Buenas Noches – An evening talk show hosted by Francisco "Kiko" Bautista, Carla Angola, and Roland Carreño.
Sabado en la Noche – A Saturday night talk show hosted by Rocío Higuera, Gabriela Paez y Melisa Rauseo.
Cuando las ganas se juntan – A Sunday night show with Bettsimar Diaz.
Analisis Situacional – A Sunday interviewer  program  conducted by Oscar Schemel
Turismo con Montenegro – Sunday morning turistic program hosted by Alvaro Montenegro
Yo Prometo – A Sunday news show hosted by Nitu Pérez Osuna.
El Rostro sin máscara – conducido por el criminalista Juan Manuel Mayorca.
El Mundo, Economía y Negocios – A Sunday news magazine of economy.
Fun Race – A documentary series on 4X4s hosted by Sabrina Salvador.

Relationship with government

For a long time, Globovisión was very critical of the Chavista movement. Along with other private TV stations, it supported opposition protests against President Hugo Chávez. 

Globovision is able to broadcast outside of Venezuela, and does so through satellite television. Microwave equipment, which allows for live transmissions, has been seized by the Government.

In May 2007, President Chávez claimed during a speech that Globovision had been actively encouraging civil unrest in Venezuela, as well as his assassination. His claim on the latter was based on broadcast footage of the attempted murder of Pope John Paul II (which was part of a series of pictures showing RCTV's historical news coverage) in combination with a song titled "Esto no termina aquí" ("This does not end here"). The Venezuelan Government filed a complaint against Globovision with the Attorney General Office on this matter. Venezuelan students marched in the streets to protest the closure of RCTV and threats to Globovision. Globovision's director, Alberto Ravell, said, "We are not going to change our editorial line that we are not afraid of the threats from this government."

In information published through WikiLeaks from the United States Embassy in Venezuela, after "60 allegations" against Globovisión in Venezuelan court, the Venezuelan government pressured a partner, banker Nelson Mezerhane, to buy all the shares of Globovisión in order to fire Ravell.

After the 2013 sale of Globovisión to Juan Domingo Cordero, Globovisión's managerial staff stated that the editorial line would be changed and would be forced to move to the "centre".

Investigation
In 2009, Venezuela's telecommunications regulator launched four different investigations into Globovisión. Reporting about an earthquake before an official report later made on the official government channel and not paying $2.3 million tax for giving free airtime to anti-government groups during the 2002 oil strike were two of the accusations in the investigations. Chávez demanded sanctions against Globovisión, calling station director Alberto Federico Ravell "a crazy man with a cannon". This action was criticized by two officials who monitor freedom of speech, Frank La Rue of the United Nations and Catalina Botero of the OAS.

On March 25, 2010, network owner Guillermo Zuloaga was briefly arrested, then released pending investigation, by Venezuelan military intelligence.  The country's Attorney General Luisa Ortega Diaz stated that the arrest was for speech by Zuloaga that President Hugo Chávez deemed false and "offensive."

Human Rights Watch, Amnesty International, the Human Rights Foundation, the Inter American Press Association, the International Press Institute, the United States Department of State, Reporters without Borders, representatives of the Catholic Church, and others have protested the investigation and Chavez's infringement on press freedom in Venezuela.

References

External links
Globovisión 

 
24-hour television news channels
Censorship in Venezuela
Television channels and stations established in 1994
Television stations in Venezuela
Television networks in Venezuela
Spanish-language television stations
1994 establishments in Venezuela
Media of the Crisis in Venezuela